Londonderry is an unincorporated community in eastern Liberty Township, Ross County, Ohio, United States. It has a post office with the ZIP code 45647. It lies along U.S. Route 50 at its intersection with State Route 327.

History
Londonderry was laid out in 1831. A post office was established under the name Gillespieville in 1833, and the name was changed to Londonderry in 1929. The present name is derived from Londonderry, Northern Ireland, the native home of a first settler.

Gallery

Notable person
Harley Warrick, barn painter

References

Unincorporated communities in Ohio
Unincorporated communities in Ross County, Ohio
1831 establishments in Ohio